Pithocarpa pulchella (common name - beautiful pithocarpa) is an erect, rigid, perennial herb in the Asteraceae family, which is endemic to the south-west of  Western Australia.

It was first described in 1839 by John Lindley. There are no synonyms.

References

External links 
 Pithocarpa pulchella occurrence data from the Australasian Virtual Herbarium

Gnaphalieae
Flora of Western Australia
Taxa named by John Lindley
Plants described in 1839